The Adult R&B Songs chart (formerly called Adult R&B Airplay) is an airplay chart that is published weekly by Billboard magazine. The chart tracks and measures the airplay of songs played on urban adult contemporary radio stations, whose playlist mostly include contemporary R&B and traditional R&B tracks. Nielsen Audio sometimes refers to the format as Urban adult contemporary radio. Billboard created the chart in September 1993, with the first number one being "Another Sad Love Song" by Toni Braxton.

Chart criteria
There are thirty positions on this chart and it is solely based on radio airplay. 65 urban AC radio stations are electronically monitored 24 hours a day, seven days a week by. Songs are ranked based on the number of plays that each song received during that week.

Songs receiving the greatest growth will receive a "bullet", although there are tracks that will also get bullets if the loss in detections doesn't exceed the percentage of downtime from a monitored station. "Airpower" awards are issued to songs that appear on the top 20 of both the airplay and audience chart for the first time, while the "greatest gainer" award is given to song with the largest increase in detections. A song with six or more spins in its first week is awarded an "airplay add". If a song is tied for the most spins in the same week, the one with the biggest increase that previous week will rank higher, but if both songs show the same amount of spins regardless of detection the song that is being played at more stations is ranked higher. Songs that fall below the top 15 and have been on the chart after 20 weeks are removed.

Artist achievements

Most number-ones

Songs with most total weeks in the top ten

Artist to collect number one singles in three or more consecutive decades

See also
R&B/Hip-Hop Airplay

References

External links
Current BDS Adult R&B Songs chart (updated weekly)

Billboard charts
Rhythm and blues